Platycerium alcicorne is a species of staghorn fern (Platycerium) native to Madagascar, the Seychelles and Comoros Islands, as well as Mozambique and Zimbabwe.

It is cultivated as an ornamental plant for gardens.

References 

 Aluka entry - Platycerium alcicorne
 Platycerium.co.za entry
 FernSiam: Platycerium alcicorne entry 

alcicorne
Ferns of Africa
Flora of Madagascar
Flora of the Comoros
Flora of Mozambique
Flora of Seychelles
Flora of Zimbabwe
Paleotropical flora
Garden plants of Africa